The England national cricket team toured New Zealand in February and March 1975 and played a two-match Test series against the New Zealand national cricket team. England won the series 1–0 with one match drawn.

Test series summary

First Test

Second Test

One-day internationals

First ODI

Second ODI

References

1975 in English cricket
1975 in New Zealand cricket
New Zealand cricket seasons from 1970–71 to 1999–2000
1974-75
International cricket competitions from 1970–71 to 1975